Berta Vázquez (born Birtukan Tibebe; 28 March 1992) is a Ukrainian-born Spanish actress, model, and singer. Her career began in dance, and later transitioned to acting and music. Vázquez first appeared in Palm Trees in the Snow (2015). She played  Estefania "Rizos" Kabila in Vis a vis.

Biography
Birtukan Tibebe was born in Kyiv, Ukraine in 1992 to an Ethiopian father and a Ukrainian mother. At the age of three, she was adopted by a family in Elche, Spain. She began her dance career training in the Paula Yeray school in Elche. She found the opportunities have come through acting, and to a lesser extent, music.

At age 18, she moved from Elche to Madrid. In 2013, she sent a music video for the casting of The Voice Spain, but was not selected.

In 2014, she was cast in her first role in the film Palmeras en la nieve (2015), based on the novel by Luz Gabás. She played Bisila, who falls in love with Kilian, played by Mario Casas. Vázquez begin dating her co-star and lead actor Mario Casas in 2014 before film production of Palmeras en la Nieve. In 2018 New Years Eve Casas wrote on his social media platforms that he and Vázquez had officially broken up. Also in 2015 Vázquez played her most important role as Estefanía Kabila "Rizos" in Vis a vis, sentenced for 3 years. Through out her career, she has used various stage names, including Cleo Brian, Mila Russo and currently, Berta Vázquez.

Filmography
 Welcome to Eden (2022) as Claudia
 Vis a vis (2015–2019) as Estefania "Rizos" Kabila
 The Laws of Thermodynamics (2018) as Elena
 El accidente (2017–2018) as María
 En tu cabeza (2016) as Camarera
 Paquita Salas (2016) as Berta Vázquez
 Las pequeñas cosas (2016) as actress
 Palmeras en la nieve (2015) as Bisila
 L'Agent (2013) as The Party

References

External links
 

1992 births
21st-century Spanish actresses
Spanish television actresses
Spanish film actresses
Ukrainian television actresses
Ukrainian film actresses
21st-century Ukrainian actresses
Living people
Ukrainian people of Ethiopian descent
Spanish people of Ukrainian descent
Spanish people of Ethiopian descent
Spanish adoptees